v/s may refer to:
 V/S, a Ship prefix
 V/s or Volts/second, unit of slew rate